Marcel Hagmann (born 7 January 1983) is a German former professional footballer who played as a defender.

Career
Hagmann made his debut on the professional league level in the 2. Bundesliga for FC Ingolstadt 04 on 28 October 2008 when he started a game against SV Wehen Wiesbaden.

References

1983 births
Living people
German footballers
Association football midfielders
Eintracht Frankfurt II players
SV Arminia Hannover players
SV Wilhelmshaven players
FC Ingolstadt 04 players
SSV Jahn Regensburg players
1. FC Saarbrücken players
FC Ingolstadt 04 II players
2. Bundesliga players
3. Liga players
Regionalliga players